Eightmile Island is a forested island on the Ohio River in Mason County, West Virginia. The island is located directly across the river from the village of Cheshire, Ohio and American Electric Power Company power plant facilities there.

The map is a clip from Harry Gordon's map ( 1766) showing the "Indian Trade" safe camp site when on the main canoe route.

See also 
List of islands of West Virginia

River islands of West Virginia
Landforms of Mason County, West Virginia
Islands of the Ohio River